In algebraic geometry, a Noetherian local ring R is called parafactorial if it has depth at least 2 and the Picard group Pic(Spec(R) − m) of its spectrum with the closed point m removed is trivial.

More generally, a scheme X is called parafactorial along a closed subset Z if the subset Z is "too small" for invertible sheaves to detect; more precisely if for every open set V the map from P(V) to P(V ∩ U) is an equivalence of categories, where U = X – Z and P(V) is the category of invertible sheaves on V.  A Noetherian local ring is parafactorial if and only if its spectrum is parafactorial along its closed point.

Parafactorial local rings were introduced by

Examples

Every Noetherian local ring of dimension at least 2 that is factorial is parafactorial. However local rings of dimension at most 1 are not parafactorial, even if they are factorial.
Every Noetherian complete intersection local ring of dimension at least 4 is parafactorial.
For a locally Noetherian scheme, a closed subset is parafactorial if the local ring at every point of the subset is parafactorial. For a locally Noetherian regular scheme, the closed parafactorial subsets are those of codimension at least 2.

References

Commutative algebra